In mathematics, the annihilator method is a procedure used to find a particular solution to certain types of non-homogeneous ordinary differential equations (ODE's).  It is similar to the method of undetermined coefficients, but instead of guessing the particular solution in the method of undetermined coefficients, the particular solution is determined systematically in this technique. The phrase undetermined coefficients can also be used to refer to the step in the annihilator method in which the coefficients are calculated.

The annihilator method is used as follows.  Given the ODE , find another differential operator  such that . This operator is called the annihilator, hence the name of the method. Applying  to both sides of the ODE gives a homogeneous ODE  for which we find a solution basis  as before. Then the original inhomogeneous ODE is used to construct a system of equations restricting the coefficients of the linear combination to satisfy the ODE.

This method is not as general as variation of parameters in the sense that an annihilator does not always exist.

Annihilator table 

If  consists of the sum of the expressions given in the table, the annihilator is the product of the corresponding annihilators.

Example
Given , .

Setting  we find

 

giving the system

which has solutions

, 

giving the solution set

 

This solution can be broken down into the homogeneous and nonhomogeneous parts. Since this is a second-order equation, two such conditions are necessary to determine these values.

The fundamental solutions  and  can be further rewritten using Euler's formula:

 

 

Then , and a suitable reassignment of the constants gives a simpler and more understandable form of the complementary solution, .

Ordinary differential equations